Kocasinan is a metropolitan district of the city of Kayseri in the Central Anatolia region of Turkey. The name comes from Mimar Sinan, the Great, famous Ottoman architect. The mayor is Bekir Yıldız (AKP)

References

Populated places in Kayseri Province
Districts of Kayseri Province